Sirayil Sila Raagangal is a 1990 Indian Tamil-language film, directed by Rajendrakumar, starring Murali, Pallavi and Prathap Pothan.

Cast

Murali
Pallavi
Prathap Pothan
Sarath Kumar
Vijayakumar
Kumarimuthu
Idichapuli Selvaraj
Thyagu
Thakkali Srinivasan
Bava Lakshmanan

Soundtrack

The soundtrack was composed by Maestro Ilaiyaraaja. Six songs were composed for the film.

References

External links
 

1990 films
Films scored by Ilaiyaraaja
1990s Tamil-language films